Libussa (minor planet designation: 264 Libussa) is a Main belt asteroid that was discovered by C. H. F. Peters on December 22, 1886, in Clinton, New York and was named after Libussa, the legendary founder of Prague. It is classified as an S-type asteroid.

Photometric observations of this asteroid at the Organ Mesa Observatory in Las Cruces, New Mexico, in 2008 gave an asymmetrical, bimodal light curve with a period of 9.2276 ± 0.0002 hours and a brightness variation of 0.33 ± 0.03 in magnitude. Observation from the W. M. Keck Observatory show an angular size of 57 mas, which is close to the resolution limit of the instrument. The estimated maximum size of the asteroid is about 66 ± 7 km. It has an asymmetrical shape with a size ratio of more than 1.22 between the major and minor axes.

Between 2005 and 2021, 264 Libussa has been observed to occult five stars.

References

External links
 The Asteroid Orbital Elements Database
 Minor Planet Discovery Circumstances
 Asteroid Lightcurve Data File
 
 

Background asteroids
Libussa
Libussa
S-type asteroids (Tholen)
S-type asteroids (SMASS)
18861222
Objects observed by stellar occultation